Lionel Garnett may refer to:
 Lionel Garnett (bowls)
 Lionel Garnett (cricketer)